HSC Sim is a process simulator based on the HSC Chemistry software and databases. It has been implemented as a module to HSC Chemistry 7.0 in 2007 and can be used primarily for static process simulation. HSC stands for H ([enthalpy]), S ([entropy]) and Cp([heat capacity]).

Applications 
HSC Sim has been primarily developed for the use in the mining and mineral industry, though other use such as modelling of biochemical and organic chemistry processes is possible as well.
In mineral industry the simulator is used for process operator training as an OTS (operator training simulator).

References 
 Outotec
 HSC Chemistry webpage
 Training Simulator for Flotation Process Operators

Simulation software
Chemical engineering software